Turnbull Canyon is a 4 mile loop trail located near Whittier, California and is part of Puente Hills Preserve. It lies in the northern-central part of the preserve, and is an east-west canyon with relatively steep drainage. The canyon has a creek at its bottom that supports a narrow strip of riparian woodland dominated by sycamore trees, while the slopes are covered in coastal sage and native and non-native grasses.

Climate
The climate in Turnbull Canyon is typical of Southern California, semi-arid. Because the Whittier Hills has a relatively close proximity to the ocean, which has an equalizing effect on the climate, it is somewhat cooler here than some of the areas just south of the region. During the winter months, it is not uncommon to see frost on the ground and during summer, it rarely gets hotter than 95 degrees.

History and Legends
In the early Spanish Colonial Period, Several Tongva (Gabrieleño) Indians were supposedly put to death at Turnbull Canyon in the Puente Hills for rebelling against the Spanish and the Franciscan Friars at nearby Mission San Gabriel. As a result Turnbul Canyon supposedly had the nickname 'Hotuuknga' (the place of darkness/death). However, after research done by John Garside & Marty Shields, it is believed that this legend is inaccurate. Some rebellious Tongva were killed in the swamps around present day El Monte. The original name of Turnbull Canyon was 'Ahwingna' and the legendary name 'Hotuuknga' actually referred to the hills around Yorba Linda.

Turnbull Canyon was named after Scottish immigrant Robert Turnbull after buying the canyon from Quaker businessmen in Whittier in the 1870s to raise sheep. He later sold the land back to the Quakers in the 1880s for a profit. Turnbull's luck ran out after that; he became a town drunk and was murdered. The Quakers decided to name the canyon after Turnbull in his honor.

Oil exploration and drilling began to expand into Turnbull Canyon in the 1890s and a crude dirt road was constructed through the canyon. In November 1900, two oilmen in their wagon were chased out of the canyon by two large cougars as their horses panicked. By 1913, the road was paved for the first time for automobiles.

Since then, Turnbull Canyon has developed a strange collection of various myths and urban legends, including tragic murders.

Visitors

Attractions
Turnbull Canyon is known for the view it provides of the Hsi Lai Temple and Rose Hills Memorial Park.  It has also been the source of rumors regarding paranormal activities  and was the scene of the discovery a then-missing person's body.

See also
 Puente Hills
 San Gabriel Valley
 California Floristic Province
 California chaparral and woodlands

References

External links 

 Puente Hills Preserve Park Map
 Puente Hills Preserve Park - activities and homepage
 The Puente Hills Preserve:  Puente - Chino Hills Wildlife Corridor
 The Puente Hills Preserve: Trails Access info.
 Puente Hills Landfill Native Habitat Preservation Authority
 Puente Hills Nature Blog (archives)

Puente Hills
Canyons and gorges of California
Landforms of Los Angeles County, California
California folklore